Spirotryprostatin A is an indolic alkaloid from the 2,5-Diketopiperazine class of natural products found in the Aspergillus fumigatus fungus.  Spirotryprostatin A and several other indolic alkaloids (including Spirotryprostatin B, as well as other tryprostatins and cyclotryprostatins) have been found to have anti-mitotic properties, and as such they have become of great interest as anti-cancer drugs. Because of this, the total syntheses of these compounds is a major pursuit of organic chemists, and a number of different syntheses have been published in the chemical literature.

One such total synthesis was published in 1999, which showed that the isopropylidene side chain was not necessary to the biological activity of the compound, leading to a number of new theorized analogues.

References 

Alkaloids
Diketopiperazines
Heterocyclic compounds with 3 rings
Heterocyclic compounds with 2 rings
Methoxy compounds